Megachile inermis is a species of bee in the family Megachilidae. It was described by Provancher in 1888.

References

Inermis
Insects described in 1888